The Kennerdell Bridge is a girder bridge connecting Rockland Township and Clinton Township in Venango County, Pennsylvania that serves the tiny village of Kennerdell (with a population of only about 200). Originally, a 1907 truss bridge stood on this site. It was rehabilitated in 1981, but ultimately replaced in 2000. Only about 250 cars use the bridge each day

See also
List of crossings of the Allegheny River

References
Nat'l Bridges
Bridge Hunter

Bridges over the Allegheny River
Bridges completed in 2000
Bridges in Venango County, Pennsylvania
Road bridges in Pennsylvania
Girder bridges in the United States